Pillat is a Romanian surname. Notable people with the surname include:

Dinu Pillat (1921–1975), Romanian literary critic and writer, son of Ion
Ion Pillat (1891–1945), Romanian poet

See also
Pillet

Romanian-language surnames